Gentian Manuka (born 2 August 1991 in Peshkopi) is an Albanian footballer.

Club career

Early career
Manuka was born in Peshkopi but move to and grew up in the seaside city of Durrës, where he began his career with local youth side Shkëndija Durrës. He signed for Greek side Kavala FC in 2011 but due to problems at the club caused by the Koriopolis (match fixing scandal) Manuka was loaned out to newly promoted Albanian Superliga side KS Kamza for the entire 2011–12 season.

References

External links
Profile at UEFA.com

External links
 Profile - FSHF

1991 births
Living people
People from Peshkopi
Footballers from Durrës
Albanian footballers
Association football midfielders
Kavala F.C. players
FC Kamza players
FK Kukësi players
KS Kastrioti players
Besa Kavajë players
Besëlidhja Lezhë players
KF Tërbuni Pukë players
Kategoria Superiore players
Kategoria e Parë players
Albanian expatriate footballers
Expatriate footballers in Greece
Albanian expatriate sportspeople in Greece